This is a list of members of the Australian Capital Territory House of Assembly from 1982 to 1986. The ACT was not self-governing at this time.

The term was allowed to expire in 1986 due to plans to introduce full self-government for the territory.

 Horder resigned from the Assembly in 1985 and was replaced by Kevin Gill. 

 Walsmley resigned from the Assembly in 1985 and was replaced by Rosemary Follett. 

Members of Australian Capital Territory parliaments by term
20th-century Australian politicians